Grist is a surname. Notable people with the surname include:

Don Grist (1935-2022), American politician and judge
Hilary Grist, Canadian singer-songwriter
Ian Grist (1938–2002), British Conservative politician
Mark Grist, British poet and battle rapper
Nicky Grist (born 1961), Welsh rally co-driver
Paul Grist (born 1960), British comic book creator
Reri Grist (born 1932), American operatic soprano
Ryan Grist, British Army Captain

English-language surnames